Saroba maculicosta is a moth of the family Noctuidae first described by Francis Walker in 1865. It is found in Sundaland, the Philippines, Papuan region to Solomon islands and Sri Lanka.

Its wingspan is 4 cm. Forewings rich, dark, rusty brown with one small and two prominent white spots along each forewing costa.

References

External links
Nine New Records of Moth from Andaman and Nicobar Islands

Moths of Asia
Moths described in 1865